Port Sudan New International Airport  is an airport serving Port Sudan, Sudan. Opened in 1992, it replaced the old old Port Sudan Airport.
Port Sudan New International Airport is a full member of the IATA as of 2014.

Airlines and destinations

Accidents and incidents
On 8 July 2003, Sudan Airways Flight 139, a Boeing 737, crashed about 15 minutes after take-off. All but one of the 117 passengers and crew were killed in the crash. The cause was mechanical failure followed by pilot error. A baby was the only survivor of the accident.

Port Sudan Air Base

The airport hosts Sudanese Air Force Flight School (Chengdu JJ-5 (FT-5) and K-8S).

References 

Airports in Sudan
Port Sudan